Annaphila depicta, also called the rusty-barred annaphila, is a species of moth in the family Noctuidae (the owlet moths). It is found in North America. The wingspan is 21-24 mm. Its forewing is gray with a reddish-brown band. The hindwing is orange with black markings. It looks similar to Annaphila decia, but A. decia has more black markings on its hindwings than A. depicta. A. depicta's larvae are green and feed on Nemophila menziesii.

The MONA or Hodges number for Annaphila depicta is 9866.

Subspecies
These two subspecies belong to the species Annaphila depicta:
 Annaphila depicta depicta
 Annaphila depicta morula Rindge & Smith, 1952

References

Further reading

 
 
 

Amphipyrinae
Articles created by Qbugbot
Moths described in 1873